Washington's 45th legislative district is one of forty-nine districts in Washington state for representation in the state legislature. It extends from Kirkland on the west, to Duvall on the east, and Sammamish on the south. 

The district's legislators are state senator Manka Dhingra and state representatives Roger Goodman (position 1) and Larry Springer (position 2), all Democrats.

On November 7, 2017, there was a special election to fill the district's state senate seat. Independent Parker Harris was eliminated in the top-two primary, and then Democrat Manka Dhingra defeated Republican Jinyoung Englund by 11 points, handing control of the Washington State Senate to the Democrats.

See also
Washington Redistricting Commission
Washington State Legislature
Washington State Senate
Washington House of Representatives

External links
Washington State Redistricting Commission
Washington House of Representatives
Map of Legislative Districts

45